Arens de Lledó or Arenys de Lledó is a municipality located in the Matarraña/Matarranya comarca, province of Teruel, Aragon, Spain. According to the 2008 census (INE), the municipality has a population of 217 inhabitants, and covers an area of 34.27 square kilometres. It is situated in the Franja de Ponent.

Municipality 

Arens de Lledo is very near neighbours with Horta de San Juan, Catalunya on one side (known for its entrance to the Natural Park El Ports and that it is said that Picasso invented cubism after staying there), and also the cultural capital of Matarraña Calaceite, (Aragon) an old favourite for visiting artists from all round the world.

The village of Arens de Lledó is located in the most eastern part of the province of Teruel. It is in a hilly area by the river Algars, which marks the border between the  Terra Alta (Catalonia) and Aragon. The river Algars has  a very popular place where residents and visitors go to bathe "El Galero". Overlooking the village stands the Church of the Assumption of the Virgin Mary. The church is a Gothic structure (15th and 16th centuries) with an archway which dates from the Middle Ages. In the sanctuary stands a decorative sculpture of two fish, the symbol of this village. On February 8, 1983, the church was declared an "object of cultural interest".

History

Bronze and Iberian Period
First human settlement.

Islamic Era
Remains of an "Azud,"Arabic word meaning 'barrier', used with the usual river rise or flow in order to divert a part of this flow to the canals.

Middle Ages
There are remnants of the Middle Ages within the old city wall and 6 km away. At the chapel of St. Hippolytus (Sant Pol), a base of a medieval column can be found. A cross of the Templar can also still be found is there. This holy place is today a centre of pilgrimage and a procession is held every year on the first Saturday in May. Tradition says that this place was visited by women to ask for fertility. The path to the chapel is flanked by ancient cypress trees.

Contemporary era
The Spanish Civil War, (1936 to 1939) also affected this village. In the nearby town of Gandesa (in Catalonia) there is a museum about the Battle of the Ebro. Due to the large post-war chaos and very cold weather temperatures (which affected farming), there was a migration to and around Barcelona and also to Valencia, in order to search for new employment opportunities.

Ermita de San Pol 
6 kilometers from Arens de Lledo, but still within municipal boundaries, is the Chapel of St. Hippolytus (Sant Pol), built on a former medieval hermitage. Century old cypresses help to give a mystical feeling to the site of the chapel. This mystical feeling was probably the reason why this used to be a meeting place for well-known artists, in order to talk about their art.
On the first Saturday of May each year there is a pilgrimage concluding with Mass held in the chapel.

Economy
Agriculture is the main source of income. Crops of olives, almonds and grapes are farmed. There is also a rapidly growing sector of Rural Tourism, with a range of accommodation and activities. There is a winery that produces wines of great quality, a few small shops and an agricultural cooperative.

Demography 
Probably because of the beautiful landscape of this area the population has increased rapidly in recent years, with people from  elsewhere in Spain and even from other European countries and North America immigrating to the area. Indeed, the local school has a half local, half foreign population with the common spoken languages being Spanish and Catalan.

Nature

Algars
The river Algars flows between Catalonia and Aragon. It is a tributary of the River Matarraña, and home to, for example native crayfish, turtles and catfish. Natural pools and eroded rock formations mark the course of the Algars which invite you, on hot summer days to bathe and swim. Known as "El Galero" it is a popular swimming area with its natural pools, a place where residents and visitors of this beautiful village love to be.

Birds
Majestic golden eagles and also vultures can be seen as they fly over the area. In the pine forests, among other more common birds,  the woodpecker and the Crossbill can be observed.

Fauna
With a little luck Hispanic goats can be viewed. Squirrels often cross the road. If you do a night tour, you might encounter wild mountain cats, wild boar, or  foxes.

Els Ports
Not far from Arens de Lledo, by its neighbour of Horta St Joan, lies the National Natural Park with attracts tourists from around the World.

Vegetation
Pine forests, juniper, maple, yew, hazel, holly oak, almond, olive and oak trees. There are also medicinal and aromatic herb species like thyme and rosemary.

Events

Three Kings Day (January 5). There is a pilgrimage to the town hall square, where the three kings give their gifts to children and adults, if their name is called, this organized by the parish church.
San Antonio Abad (17 January or the first subsequent Saturday): dishes and desserts are auctioned. The total value raised by the auction goes to the church and its works. Organized by the Commission Sant Pol.
Santa Agueda (February 11). Women's Day. On this day the tradition of honouring women is held. Religious rites are held in favour of Santa Agueda. Delivery of the "nipple", along with food for women and different festivities. Organized by the Commission of Santa Agueda.
Carnival. Children and Adults parade costumed through the streets of the village followed by a village dance. Organized by the Cultural Association El Galero.
Easter. Processions. Organized by the church.
St. George (23 April). Sales of flowers and books. Events are organised for children. Organized by: AMPA and the Cultural Association El Galero.
St. Pol (On the first Saturday in May). Pilgrimage. Traditional Mass in the chapel, a place frequented by the locals. Family meals and games. Organized by: the City of Arens de Lledo, the Association of St. Pol and the Festival Committee.
San Cristóbal (10 July). Blessing of vehicles. Organized by the parish church. Dinner at the Sports Center. Organizers: The Festival Committee. (Organiza Comisión de Fiestas)
Cultural Week (August 6 to 10). Organisation: Cultural Association El Galero.
Fiestas Mayores  (12 to 17 August). Different parties and music throughout the week.
Organizers: The Festival Committee  (Organiza Comisión de Fiestas)

The cultural association El Galero organizes various workshops and events throughout the year.

References
↑ Consejo General de Procuradores de España

↑ Según aparece en el Decreto Legislativo 2/2006, de 27 de diciembre, del Gobierno de Aragón, por el que se aprueba el texto refundido de la Ley de Delimitación Comarcal de Aragón.

↑ Alcaldes de Aragón de las elecciones de 2011.

See also
 Iglesia de la Asunción
 Anexo:Municipios de la provincia de Teruel
 Anexo:Municipios catalanófonos de Aragón según el Anteproyecto de la Ley de Lenguas
 Anexo:Toponimia de los municipios de la Franja de Aragón

Municipalities in the Province of Teruel
Matarraña/Matarranya